Three X Gordon is a 1918 American silent comedy drama film directed by Ernest C. Warde and starring J. Warren Kerrigan, Lois Wilson and Charles K. French.

Cast
 J. Warren Kerrigan as Harold Chester Winthrop Gordon 
 Lois Wilson as Dorrie Webster 
 Charles K. French as Jim Gordon 
 Gordon Sackville as Mr. Webster 
 John Gilbert as Archie 
 Jay Belasco as Walter 
 Leatrice Joy as Farmer's Daughter 
 Walter Perry as Farmer Muldoon 
 Don Bailey as Josiah Higgins 
 Stanhope Wheatcroft as Thomas Jefferson Higgins

References

Bibliography
 Golden, Eve. John Gilbert: The Last of the Silent Film Stars. University Press of Kentucky, 2013.

External links
 

1918 films
1918 comedy films
1910s English-language films
American silent feature films
American black-and-white films
Films directed by Ernest C. Warde
Films distributed by W. W. Hodkinson Corporation
Silent American comedy films
1910s American films